World Waterpark is a water park located within the West Edmonton Mall in Edmonton, Alberta, Canada. Opened to the public in 1986, it is the second largest indoor water park in North America, after American Dream's DreamWorks Water Park which opened on October 1, 2020.

In 2020, World Waterpark temporarily closed for the first time due to the COVID-19 Pandemic in Canada. While some parts did temporarily close, the whole park did not close down until mid-March 2020.

Blue Thunder wave pool
This wave pool has four active wave bays, each with 2 panels operated by a  hydraulic system (8 total active panels). For many years, the 4 panels in the two outer wave bays have been disabled, apparently due to the waves being far too intense, resulting in injuries; guests were being thrown into each other when all 12 panels were operating, as they were in the 1980s.

It is arguably the most popular attraction in the park, as many swimmers (most with inner tubes) can be found bobbing in the water. The start of every session is marked with a loud air horn blast, warning swimmers to be ready for a wave to flip them over.

Most evenings, after regular park business hours, the Blue Thunder wave pool is used by clubs for surfing, kayaking and stand-up paddleboarding. For these activities, the waves are often programmed for increased intensity and continuous operation.

In September 2018, the water park underwent a $2.5 million renovation including repainting the wave pool, renovated cabanas, additional bathrooms, new beach area flooring, and upgraded signage.

Slides

Beginner slides

Intermediate slides

Advanced slides

Extreme slides

Upcoming Slides

Decommissioned slides

Additional attractions

Other information
World Waterpark also has two hot tubs: one double and one single.

Concessions:
 Beachview Bar/Snacks
 Piña Colada Bar
 Coconut Grove
 Tiki Dog
Former:
 Hot Dog Hut

Tubes can be rented at a cost, while PFDs (lifejackets) can be borrowed for no charge at Sharky's Supply Shack.

Gallery

See also
Galaxyland
Wild Rapids Waterslides

References

External links

1997 World Waterpark commercial

Water parks in Canada
Tourist attractions in Edmonton
1986 establishments in Alberta